Al-Surah al-Saghirah is a town is situated in the Mantiqat Shahba (Shahba district) of As Suwayda Governorate, in southern Syria. According to the Syria Central Bureau of Statistics (CBS), Al-Surah al-Saghirah had a population of 1,517 in the 2004 census.

References

Populated places in Shahba District
Towns in Syria
Druze communities in Syria